Sara Emil Baaring (née Andersen; born 11 October 1986) is a Danish politician and member of the Folketing, the national legislature. A Social Democrat, she has represented Funen since November 2022.

Emil Baaring was born on 11 October 1986 in Verninge. She is the daughter of carpenter Mogens Andersen and social education worker Suzanne Baaring Rasmussen. She has a degree in teaching from University College Lillebaelt (2017). She studied education at University College South Denmark between 2020 and 2022. She taught at Verninge Skole from 2014 to 2022. She was a member of the municipal council in Assens Municipality from 2010 to 2022.

Emil Baaring is married to Mark Emil Baaring and has two children.

References

External links

1986 births
21st-century Danish women politicians
Danish municipal councillors
Danish schoolteachers
Living people
Members of the Folketing 2022–2026
People from Assens Municipality
Social Democrats (Denmark) politicians
Women members of the Folketing